Urtė Juodvalkytė (born 23 December 1986) is a road cyclist from Lithuania. She participated at the 2006 UCI Road World Championships and 2011 UCI Road World Championships.

References

External links
 profile at Procyclingstats.com

1986 births
Lithuanian female cyclists
Living people
Place of birth missing (living people)